Hosea 11 is the eleventh chapter of the Book of Hosea in the Hebrew Bible or the Old Testament of the Christian Bible. This chapter contains the prophecies attributed to the prophet Hosea son of Beeri, about God's former benefits, and Israel's ingratitude resulting in punishment, but God still promises restoration. It is a part of the Book of the Twelve Minor Prophets.

Text 
The original text was written in Hebrew language. This chapter is divided into 12 verses in Christian Bibles, but 11 verses in the Hebrew Bible with the following verse numbering comparison:

This article generally follows the common numbering in Christian English Bible versions, with notes to the numbering in Hebrew Bible versions.

Textual witnesses
Some early manuscripts containing the text of this chapter in Hebrew are of the Masoretic Text tradition, which includes the Codex Cairensis (895), the Petersburg Codex of the Prophets (916), Aleppo Codex (10th century), Codex Leningradensis (1008). Fragments containing parts of this chapter in Hebrew were found among the Dead Sea Scrolls, including 4Q82 (4QXIIg; 25 BCE) with extant verses 2–12 (verse 11:12 = 12:1 in Masoretic Text).

There is also a translation into Koine Greek known as the Septuagint, made in the last few centuries BCE. Extant ancient manuscripts of the Septuagint version include Codex Vaticanus (B; B; 4th century), Codex Alexandrinus (A; A; 5th century) and Codex Marchalianus (Q; Q; 6th century).

God's love for Israel (11:1–11)

Verse 1
 When Israel was a child, I loved him,
and out of Egypt I called My son.
 "And out of Egypt I called My son": or "From the time that he (Israel) was in Egypt, I called him My son," (according to Bengel) in parallel to the use of "from the land of Egypt" in Hosea 12:9 and Hosea 13:4.  shows that Israel was called "My son" by God from the period of Egyptian sojourn and God is always said to "have led" or "brought forth", not to have "called", Israel from Egypt. Matthew 2:15 quotes this prophecy for Jesus' sojourn in Egypt, not His return from it. The same general reason, that is, the danger of extinction, caused Israel in its national infancy and the infant Jesus (cF. ; ; ;) to sojourn in Egypt.
The verse has two textual variants: one is the standard reading of "Out of Egypt I called my son" and a second is found in the Greek Septuagint "Out of Egypt I called his children", which is likely based on a small variation of benei, "my son", in the Hebrew Masoretic Text, to beneiu, "his children", as a possible source of Septuagint reading.

Verse 8
How can I give you up, Ephraim?
How can I hand you over, Israel?
How can I make you like Admah?
How can I set you like Zeboiim?
My heart churns within Me;
My sympathy is stirred.
 "Admah" and "Zeboim": were cities in the same plain with Sodom and Gomorrah; each with a king and, though are not mentioned by name in the narrative in Genesis, were destroyed together with Sodom and Gomorrah, as recorded in a general term "those cities and all the plain" or later in detail "...that the whole land thereof is brimstone and salt and burning, ... like the overthrow of Sodom and Gomorrah, Admah and Zeboim, which the Lord overthrew in His anger and His wrath". 
"My heart churns within Me": or "my heart is within me changed", that is, 'from anger to pity'.
The word rendered "is stirred" or "were overcome" (nik’meru), according to Rashi, "one warmed", has a close affinity with the Assyrian kamâru, "to throw down", as in Hosea 10:5 for k’mârîm, "(idolatrous) priests".
Verses 8–9 form one of the most moving passages in the Hebrew Bible, where YHWH struggles with the anguish of his love, that he cannot totally destroy Israel as he did Admah and Zeboim.

God’s Charge Against Ephraim (11:12)
Ephraim has surrounded Me with lies,
and the house of Israel with deceit.
But Judah still walks with God,
and is faithful to the Holy One.
"Holy One" or "holy ones".
An allusion to Israel's lies and deceit, which resonates with Hosea 12:1, 3, 7.

See also

Related Bible parts: Genesis 14, Genesis 19, Exodus 4, Deuteronomy 29, Hosea 6, Hosea 7, Hosea 8, Hosea 9, Hosea 10, Matthew 2

Notes

References

Sources

External links

Jewish
Hosea 11 Hebrew with Parallel English
Hosea 11 Hebrew with Rashi's Commentary

Christian
Hosea 11 English Translation with Parallel Latin Vulgate

11